Buffalo Milk Company Building, also known as the Queen City Dairy Company Building, is a historic dairy building located in Buffalo, Erie County, New York. The original section was built in 1903–1905, and is a three-story, "L"-shaped, brick and sandstone building in the Renaissance Revival style. Additions to the building were made in 1910 and 1911. The dairy was first in city to be used for large-scale for the pasteurization and distribution of milk. The building has been redeveloped as an apartment building known as the Niagara Gateway Apartments.

It was listed on the National Register of Historic Places in 2016.

References

External links
Buffalo Rising: 885 Niagara Street Comes Back To Life

Gallery 

Industrial buildings and structures on the National Register of Historic Places in New York (state)
Renaissance Revival architecture in New York (state)
Industrial buildings completed in 1905
Buildings and structures in Buffalo, New York
National Register of Historic Places in Buffalo, New York
1905 establishments in New York (state)